Adult Contemporary is a chart published by Billboard ranking the top-performing songs in the United States in the adult contemporary music (AC) market, based on weekly airplay data from radio stations compiled by Broadcast Data Systems.

The first number one of the year, in the issue of Billboard dated January 1, was "Merry Christmas" by Ed Sheeran and Elton John.  It was John's 17th Adult Contemporary number one, extending his lead for the most among all artists on the chart, and also set a new record for the longest timespan of AC number ones by an artist, coming more than 48 years after he first topped the listing. The following week "Easy on Me" by Adele returned to the number one spot, having spent three weeks atop the chart in 2021; the song remained at number one for 19 consecutive weeks until it was replaced in the issue dated May 21 as John returned to number one with "Cold Heart (Pnau remix)", a collaboration with Dua Lipa.

In the issue dated December 3, Backstreet Boys topped the chart with their version of the 1980s song "Last Christmas", which remained in the peak position for the rest of the year.  The song continued a trend of Christmas-themed tracks topping the AC chart in late November and throughout December, reflecting the fact that adult contemporary radio stations usually switch to playing exclusively festive songs in the period leading up to the holiday.

Chart history

References

External links
 Current Billboard Adult Contemporary chart

2022
Number-one adult contemporary singles
United States Adult Contemporary